Major General Rudolf Krzák (6 April 1914 - 22 April 2004) was a high ranking soldier in the Free Czech Army.

Biography 
Krzák was educated at the Czechoslovak Military Academy. He was the last survivor from the group of Czech soldiers, based in the United Kingdom, that planned Operation Anthropoid, the assassination of Reinhard Heydrich in 1942. He was the deputy commander of Special Group D which worked with SOE to train paratroopers for special operations. Amongst his two trainees for specialist operations in Europe were the two Czechoslovak paratroopers, Jan Kubiš and Jozef Gabčík.

References

External links 

 Rudolf Krzak | The Times

1914 births
2004 deaths
People from Bernartice (Písek District)
Czech resistance members
Czechoslovak soldiers
Operation Anthropoid
Soldiers of the French Foreign Legion
Recipients of the Order of the White Lion
Recipients of the Milan Rastislav Stefanik Order